Keever is a given name. Notable people with the name include:

Charlie Keever (1980–1993), 13-year-old boy who was murdered in 1993, in San Diego County, California
Jack Keever (1938–2004), American journalist and author, best known his coverage of Charles Whitman's 1966 shooting spree
Patsy Keever (born 1947), American educator and Democratic politician
Trijntje Keever (1616–1633), the tallest female person in recorded history, standing 2.54 metres (8 ft 4 in) tall
Keever Jankovich (1928–1979), American football player